Ottathai is a small village located in Kannur district in the South Indian state of Kerala. Ottathai is 4 km away from Alakode and 4 km away from Kappimala.its a good and peace full village

References

Villages in Kannur district